Left Coast Crime is an annual conference organised by mystery fiction fans for mystery fiction fans, first held in San Francisco in 1991. It is concerned with western North American region mysteries, but the conference itself travels worldwide, having been held in Canada and the United Kingdom, as well as different parts of the United States. The conference enables fans to mix with authors. A prominent author of western mystery fiction is invited to be guest speaker.

In December 2019 Mystery Writers of America awarded the convention organization the 2020 Raven Award for "outstanding achievement in the mystery field outside the realm of creative writing."

Lefty Awards

Best Humorous Mystery Novel Award
Conference participants have voted on an award for the most humorous mystery novel since 1996.

Best Historical Mystery Novel 
The Best Historical Mystery Novel Award, also known as the Bruce Alexander Memorial Historical Mystery Award, established in 2004, is presented "to mystery novels covering events before 1960."

Best Mystery Novel

Best Début Mystery 
The Lefty for Best Debut Mystery has gone by many names, include the Eureka! Award (2012), the Rosebud Award (2015), and finally, the Left for Best Debut Mystery.

Wildcard Awards 
In addition to regular Lefty Awards, wildcard awards have occasionally been presented. One regularly occurring wild card award is based on geographical location, with its name changing depending upon the location of the convention, such as the Otter (Monterey, 2004), the Calavera (El Paso, 2005), the Rocky (Denver, 2008; Colorado Springs, 2013), and the Rose (Portland, 2015). Left Coast Crime has also presented awards according to other geographic regions, such as the Hillerman Sky (Southwest settings, 2011), the Golden Nugget (California settings, 2012), the Squid (US settings, 2014), and the Calamari (non-US settings, 2014).

Other wildcard awards "include the Watson, for the mystery with the best sidekick (Santa Fe 2011 & Colorado Springs 2013), and the Hawaii Five-O, for best law enforcement or police procedural (Waikoloa, Hawaii 2009). The Panik award was given in memory of Paul Anik for best LA noir (Los Angeles 2010). Cover art was recognized with the Arty (Denver 2008)."

Notes

References

External links 

 Official website

Mystery and detective fiction awards
1991 establishments in the United States
Awards established in 1996